Sir George Lloyd Hodges  (1792 – 14 December 1862) was a British soldier and diplomat.

He was born at the Old Abbey, County Limerick, Ireland, the eldest son of George Thomas Hodges. He entered the British Army in 1806, and took part in the Battles of Quatre Bras and Waterloo. In 1832 he commanded the brigade of British volunteers who enlisted to fight to restore the rightful Queen of Portugal, Maria da Glória, to her throne against the forces of the usurper, Dom Miguel. With the rest of the forces commanded by Maria's father Dom Pedro, the ex-Emperor of Brazil, they sailed from Terceira in the Azores, captured Oporto and endured a siege there of nearly a year. Hodges distinguished himself by his leadership, especially during the assault on the city by Miguel's army on 29 September 1832. He afterwards published a memoir, Narrative of the Expedition to Portugal in 1832, under the orders of His Imperial Majesty Dom Pedro, Duke of Braganza (London, 1833).

Hodges was subsequently knighted and was active in the wars of the Balkans in the late 1830s. He was appointed the first British consul to Serbia on 30 January 1837, and was promoted to the rank of consul-general on 15 December 1837.

Hodges was appointed Consul-General in Egypt on 1 October 1839. On 11 May 1841, he was appointed Consul-General in the Circle of Lower Saxony and for the Free Cities of Hamburg, Bremen, and Lübeck.

References
General

Specific

1792 births
1862 deaths
Military personnel of the Liberal Wars
British consuls-general in Egypt
Knights Commander of the Order of the Bath
Ambassadors of the United Kingdom to Serbia
19th-century British Army personnel
19th-century British diplomats
British Army personnel of the Napoleonic Wars
Military personnel from County Limerick
British military personnel of the Egyptian–Ottoman War (1839–1841)
British Army officers